Oh My God! is an arcade puzzle game from Atlus. The gameplay is similar to Dr. Mario.

Gameplay
A sequence of snakes made of colored balls fall down into the playing field. The object of the game is to manipulate the direction of these snakes, by using the joystick, in order to form a line of 3 colored balls vertically, horizontally, or diagonally. The game ends when the playing field tops out, that is, when there is no room for a new snake to enter the playing field. Levels are cleared by obtaining a set number of points. Gameplay gets progressively more difficult in later levels as snakes fall at greater rates, and new colors are introduced.

Game details
Oh My God! was released in 1993 as a conversion kit rather than as a stand-alone game and was marketed only in Japan. Though it is available as a M.A.M.E. ROM, it is rated on a commonness scale of 1 to 100 as a 1, making it among the rarest of games. There are only four known instances of the game circuit boards owned by collectors, there are no known examples of assembled, functional units.

External links
Oh My God! at the KLOV

Notes

1993 video games
Atlus games
Arcade video games
Arcade-only video games
Puzzle video games
Multiplayer and single-player video games
Video game clones
Video games about reptiles
Video games developed in Japan